Hanthakana Sanchu is a 1980 Indian Kannada-language film, directed by B. Krishan and produced by K. S. Jagannath. The film stars Vishnuvardhan, Aarathi, and Jayamala. The film has musical score by Vijaya Bhaskar.

Cast

Vishnuvardhan as Dr. Murali
Aarathi as Anita
Jayamala as Aparna
Rekha Rao as Mamata
Sundar Krishna Urs as George
Lokanath as Kaverappa
Halam
Mukhyamantri Chandru as Robert
Bhargavi Narayan as mother of Anita and Mamata
Ramachandran
Boregowda
Lalithamma
Jaggu
Pradeep
Arun

Plot
The protagonist Dr. Murali who is treating Mamata, gets acquainted to her sister Anita, through George her husband. Murali(a Hindu) and Anita(a Christian), fall in love with each other and marry without the knowledge of Murali's parents. Murali's mother and his maternal uncle Kaverappa, want him to marry Aparna(Kaverappa's daughter). Murali avoids the marriage, by giving false excuses to his parents and even avoids telling them about his marriage to Anita. Meanwhile, Anita becomes pregnant and differences start cropping up between them, when Murali is not ready to tell his parents about his marriage. Anita starts working in Robert's firm. Robert had feelings for Anita, which was rejected by her before she met Murli. In the meantime Aparna gets to know about Murli's secret marriage, while visiting him at his place. She informs her father about the same. Anita gets killed mysteriously in between, when Murli and Anita decide to inform Murli's parents about their marriage and were about to visit them. How Murli finds the real killer forms the climax.

Soundtrack
The music was composed by Vijayabhaskar.

References

External links
 
 

1980 films
1980s Kannada-language films
Films scored by Vijaya Bhaskar